With You and Without You (tr. S toboy i bez tebya) is a 1973 Soviet comedy film directed by Rodion Nakhapetov.

Plot 
The film takes place during the formation of Soviet power. The rich farmer Fedor marries his girlfriend. But it is difficult for her to get used to the farm life and she decides to return to her native village.

Cast 
 Marina Neyolova as Stesha
 Juozas Budraitis as Fedor Bazyrin
 Stanislav Borodokin as Ivan
 Mayya Bulgakova as Darya - Stesha's Mother
 Vladimir Zeldin as Yevstigney - Fyodor's Father
 Ivan Kosykh as Grishka
 Nikolai Pastukhov as Roman
 Valentin Zubkov as Investigator
 Viktor Kosykh as Militiaman
 Nikolay Gorlov as Countryman

References

External links 
 

1973 films
1970s Russian-language films
Soviet comedy films
1973 comedy films